Joe Mott (born October 5, 1965) is a former professional American football player. He played three seasons as linebacker for the New York Jets and the Green Bay Packers. He stands at 6'4" and weighs 245 pounds. He attended Union Endicott High School.

References

External links
College stats

1965 births
Living people
People from Endicott, New York
Players of American football from New York (state)
American football linebackers
Iowa Hawkeyes football players
New York Jets players
Green Bay Packers players